Mario Navarro (Born in 1949) is a Mexican actor, active in the 1950s and 1960s. He made his film debut in 1956 playing a leading role in The Road of Life, following in the same year with The Beast of Hollow Mountain. In 1960 he appeared in the TV series Captain David Grief in the episode Everybody's Boy. He later had small roles in Hollywood movies such as The Black Scorpion (1957), The Magnificent Seven (1960) and Geronimo (1962).

Filmography

External links

Mexican male film actors
Living people
Mexican male television actors
1949 births